Caloptilia alni is a moth of the family Gracillariidae. It is known from China, Japan (Honshū, Hokkaidō), Korea and the Russian Far East.

The wingspan is 14.5–16 mm.

The larvae feed on Alnus hirsuta and Alnus japonica. They probably mine the leaves of their host plant.

References

alni
Moths of Asia
Moths described in 1966